Ghanshyampur is a village in Kalna I block of Purba Bardhaman district in the Indian state of  West Bengal.

References

Villages in Purba Bardhaman district